Hemidactylus cinganji is a species of gecko. It is endemic to Angola.

References

Hemidactylus
Reptiles described in 2021
Endemic fauna of Angola
Reptiles of Angola